Guari Rural LLG is a local-level government area situated in the Goilala District of the Central Province of Papua New Guinea. In 2000, the LLG had 1,148 households, and a population of 5,438 (2,880 men and 2,558 women).

Wards
The area is without a major population centre, and is divided into four wards:

 53020401 Zarima
 53020402 Kamulai
 53020403 Rupila
 53020404 Zhake

The LLG has a President and a Deputy President, and elections are normally held every five years after the national elections in September.

Villages

References

Local-level governments of Central Province (Papua New Guinea)